Prestonia amazonica is a hallucinogenic plant native to the Amazon rainforest. This plant is cited in Louisiana State Act 159.

References

amazonica
Flora of the Amazon